The Journal of Memory and Language is a peer-reviewed interdisciplinary academic journal of cognitive science, which focuses primarily on the issues of memory and language comprehension. It has been published by Elsevier since 1985. The current editor-in-chief is Kathleen Rastle (Royal Holloway, University of London).

The Institute for Scientific Information's Journal Citation Reports ranked the journal first in the field of linguistics, with a 2010 impact factor of 4.014.

Abstracting and indexing 
The journal is indexed in  Abstracts in Anthropology, Current Contents, Current Index to Journals in Education, Neuroscience Citation Index, PsycINFO, Research Alert, Scopus, and the Social Sciences Citation Index.

External links 
 

Linguistics journals
Publications established in 1985
English-language journals
Elsevier academic journals
Cognitive science journals
8 times per year journals